Paquete de Maule (also spelled Paquette de Maule and Paquete del Maule) was a small merchant sidewheel steamer built in the United States in 1861 for operation along the Chilean coast. Converted into a gunboat for service during the Chincha Islands War, she was captured by Spain and scuttled shortly thereafter.

Construction and design

Paquete de Maule, a 400-ton sidewheel steamer, was built by Lawrence & Foulks in 1861 at Williamsburg, New York for G. K. Stevenson & Co., who planned to operate the vessel between Valparaiso and Maule, Chile.

Paquete de Maule was 165 feet long, with a beam of 29 feet, depth of hold 9 feet, and draft of 8 feet 6 inches. She was built of white oak and locust, with square frames fastened with copper and treenails, and strengthened with diagonal and double laid braces. She was powered by a pair of 32-inch cylinder, 8-foot stroke vertical beam steam engines built by the Neptune Iron Works of New York, driving two  wooden sidewheels. Steam was supplied by a pair of flue boilers without blowers, located in the hold. The vessel was also brig-rigged for auxiliary sail power.

Career

During the Chincha Islands War, the Paquete del Maule served as an auxiliary ship to the Chilean fleet and she was not armed. On March 6, 1866, while en route from Lota to Montevideo with a crew of 126 men destined to complete the crews of the ironclads Huáscar and Independencia, she was captured by the Spanish frigates Blanca and Numancia  at the Gulf of Arauco.

On 10 May 1866, after the Battle of Callao, the Paquete del Maule was burned and scuttled by the Spanish near the San Lorenzo island since they couldn't take her with them on their retreat towards the Philippines.

See also

Chincha Islands War
Battle of Callao

References

Bibliography

 Frazer, John F. (Ed.) (1863): Journal of the Franklin Institute, Volume XLV, January–June 1863, p. 42, Franklin Institute, Philadelphia.

1861 ships
Ships built by Lawrence & Foulks
1860s in Chile
Naval ships of Chile
Chincha Islands War
Captured ships
Shipwrecks in the Pacific Ocean
Shipwrecks of Peru
Scuttled vessels